The Belgium men's national under-21 field hockey team represents Belgium in men's international under-21 field hockey and is controlled by the Royal Belgian Hockey Association, the governing body for field hockey in Belgium.

The team plays in the Men's EuroHockey Junior Championships and has qualified eight times for the Men's FIH Hockey Junior World Cup. Their biggest successes were winning the EuroHockey Junior Championship in 2012 and being runners-up at the 2016 Junior World Cup.

Tournament record

Junior World Cup
 1985 – 11th place
 1997 – 12th place
 2005 – 11th place
 2009 – 11th place
 2013 – 6th place
 2016 – 
 2021 – 6th place
 2023 – Qualified

EuroHockey Junior Championship
 1976 – 5th place
 1978 – 6th place
 1981 – 
 1984 – 4th place
 1996 – 5th place
 1998 – 6th place
 2002 – 6th place
 2004 – 5th place
 2006 – 
 2008 – 4th place
 2010 – 
 2012 – 
 2014 – 4th place
 2017 – 
 2019 – 5th place
 2022 –

EuroHockey Junior Championship II
 2000 – 

Source:

Players

Current squad
The following 18 players were named on 14 July 2022 for the 2022 Men's EuroHockey Junior Championship in Ghent, Belgium from 24 to 30 July 2022.

Head coach: Jeroen Baart

Caps updated as of 30 July 2022, after the match against Spain.

Recent call-ups
The following players have also been called up to the squad within the last twelve months.

See also
 Belgium men's national field hockey team
 Belgium women's national under-21 field hockey team

References

Men's national under-21 field hockey teams
Field hockey